Heart of the Storm may refer to:
 Heart of the Storm (The Lost World)
 Heart of the Storm (film)

See also
 To the Heart of the Storm, an autobiographical graphic novel by Will Eisner